Group 1 of the UEFA Euro 1976 qualifying tournament was one of the eight groups to decide which teams would qualify for the UEFA Euro 1976 finals tournament. Group 1 consisted of four teams: Czechoslovakia, England, Portugal, and Cyprus, where they played against each other home-and-away in a round-robin format. The group winners were Czechoslovakia, who finished one point above England.

Final table

Matches

Note: Attendance also reported as 22,000.

Note: The match was originally abandoned after 17 minutes on 29 October 1975 due to fog. The score at that moment was 0–0.

Goalscorers

References
 
 
 

Group 1
1974–75 in English football
1975–76 in English football
1974–75 in Czechoslovak football
1975–76 in Czechoslovak football
1974–75 in Portuguese football
1975–76 in Portuguese football

Czechoslovakia at UEFA Euro 1976